Witold may refer to:
Vytautas the Great (ca. 1350–1430), ruler of the Grand Duchy of Lithuania
Witold (given name), people with the given name Witold